Malaya Selmenga is a rural locality (a village) in Nyuksenskoye Rural Settlement, Nyuksensky District, Vologda Oblast, Russia. The population was 26 as of 2002.

Geography 
Malaya Selmenga is located 56 km southwest of Nyuksenitsa (the district's administrative centre) by road. Slekishino is the nearest rural locality.

References 

Rural localities in Nyuksensky District